Teniers is a Dutch language surname. It may refer to:

Abraham Teniers (1629–1670), Flemish painter
David Teniers the Elder (1582–1649), Flemish painter
David Teniers the Younger (1610–1690), Flemish painter
David Teniers III (1638–1685), Flemish painter
Joannes Chrysostomus Teniers, Abbot in Antwerp.
Juliaen Teniers the Elder (1572–1615), Flemish painter

Teniers
Dutch-language surnames